Metasphenisca gracilipes is a species of tephritid or fruit flies in the genus Metasphenisca of the family Tephritidae.

Distribution
Egypt, Eritrea, South Africa.

References

Tephritinae
Insects described in 1862
Diptera of Africa